Ellsworth Pope (Sandy) Bassett (February 7, 1935 - November 29, 2020) was an American politician and attorney in the state of Florida.

Bassett was born in Jacksonville in 1935. He attended Richmond College and the University of Richmond Law School. He served in the Florida House of Representatives from 1967 to 1970, representing district 44. He was a member of the Republican Party.

Bassett died in Leesburg, Florida at the age of 85, on 29 November 2020.

References

Living people
1935 births
Republican Party members of the Florida House of Representatives
People from Jacksonville, Florida
People from Maitland, Florida
University of Richmond School of Law alumni